Fougou, Guinea  is a town and sub-prefecture in the Dalaba Prefecture in the Mamou Region of northern Guinea.

References

Populated places in the Mamou Region
Sub-prefectures of Guinea